Güstrow Solarpark is a 31-megawatt (MW) photovoltaic power station near Güstrow, Germany.

See also

PV system
List of photovoltaic power stations
Solar power in Germany
Electricity sector in Germany

References

Photovoltaic power stations in Germany
2012 establishments in Germany